Mahmoud Bahmani (born 2 January 1947, in Savojbolagh) is an Iranian politician and banker. He was the Governor of the Central Bank of Iran, appointed on 2 September 2008. His term as the Governor was ended on 2 September 2013 and he was succeeded by Valiollah Seif.

Career
President Mahmoud Ahmadinejad appointed Bahmani to this position in September 2008 after dismissing then-Governor Tahmasb Mazaheri. Mazaheri had served in his office for about one year. The changeover took place shortly after a decision by the Central Bank of Iran to raise the interest rate on deposits, which was intended to the accelerating inflation rate. There was tension between government officials who favored an expansionary monetary policy despite the inflation and bankers who sought to contain it. Gholamreza Mesbahi-Moghadam, a key figure in the Majlis' Economic Commission, opposed Bahmani's appointment and the past dismissal of Mazaheri.

On 28 February 2009, Bahmani vocally criticized other financial institutions for the large injections into their currency supplies to fight the global economic recession. He said, "the United States of America and some major European countries, they ratified economic stimulus packages and injected thousands of billions of dollars into their economies that would increase inflation in the world in the near future". He also asked the International Monetary Fund and World Bank to give more support to developing countries. In the International Monetary Fund Spring Meeting from April 25–26 in Washington, D.C., Bahmani served as the representative of the group of 24 developing countries, which is known as 'G-24'.

In his term, Bahmani came up with differing estimates of inflation compared to Ahmadinejad, with the former giving 14 percent and the latter 25.4 percent from 2007 to 2008. After the figures became part of the political dispute between Ahmadinejad and his rival Mir Hossein Mousavi in the 2009 Presidential election, Bahmani threatened to resign if his estimations were disputed.

See also
Domestic policy of Mahmoud Ahmadinejad
Economy of Iran

References

External links
Central Bank of Iran (in English)

20th-century Iranian economists
1947 births
Living people
People from Alborz Province
Popular Front of Islamic Revolution Forces politicians
Governors of the Central Bank of Iran
21st-century Iranian economists